Venilia (pronounced , or as Latin Venīlia) is a Roman deity associated with the winds and the sea. According to Virgil and Ovid, she was a nymph, the sister of Amata and the wife of Janus (or Faunus), with whom she had three children: Turnus, Juturna, and Canens.

She and Salacia are the paredrae of Neptune.

The Venilia Mons, a mountain on Venus, is named for her.

See also
 Pantoporia venilia, a butterfly of the family Nymphalidae
 Terebra venilia, a species of sea snail

External links
 Neptune, Venilia, and Triton Fountain, Library of Congress, Washington DC
 Venilia and Horse, Library of Congress, Washington DC
 Venilia and Horse, detail

References 

Roman goddesses
Sky and weather goddesses
Sea and river goddesses
Neptune (mythology)